Duke of Berwick is a title that was created in the Peerage of England on 19 March 1687 for James FitzJames, the illegitimate son of James II and VII, King of England, Scotland, and Ireland and Arabella Churchill.  The title's name refers to the town of Berwick-upon-Tweed in England, near the border with Scotland.

The titles of Baron Bosworth and Earl of Tinmouth were created at the same time, and they are subsidiary to the English dukedom. As a noted Jacobite, the 1st Duke did not receive a Writ of Summons to take his place in the House of Lords after 1695, and thus the title has long been assumed to be dormant. However, as its creation is not considered part of the illegitimate Jacobite peerage, and no Writ of attainder was issued by Parliament for the Dukedom (although it was for the Duke himself), the title is still considered by some as theoretically extant, albeit dormant, in the Peerage of England and could be petitioned for reinstatement by the legitimate heirs male of the body (as detailed below in the list of Jacobite succession).

Since 13 December 1707,  when Philip V, King of Spain confirmed the title in his country, and conferred the dignity of Grandee to the 1st Duke of Berwick, the dukedom is also a title of Spanish nobility. However, unlike the English peerage, the Spanish title follows the rule of absolute primogeniture, which allows a female to succeed if she is the first-born child. Thus following the death of the 10th Duke of Berwick in September 1953, who had only a daughter, the succession has divided into two separate lines.

At this point, the English title was inherited by the nephew of the 10th Duke, Don Fernando Fitz-James Stuart y Saavedra, 19th Duke of Peñaranda (1922–1971), and subsequently Fernando's son Don Jacobo Fitz-James Stuart y Gómez, 20th Duke of Peñaranda (born 1947), who became the 12th Duke of Berwick in 1971. The heir presumptive to the Dukedom is the 12th Duke’s younger brother Don Luis Fitz-James Stuart y Gómez, 14th Marquess of Valderrábano (born 1950). Under the English rule of male primogeniture, since Jacobo and his brother Luis do not have male issue, it is expected that the English peerage title will become extinct, and with it the agnatic House of Stuart.

In contrast, in 1953, the Spanish title was inherited by the 10th Duke’s only daughter, Doña Cayetana Fitz-James Stuart, 18th Duchess of Alba (1926-2014), who was, in her own right, the 11th Duchess of Berwick. When she died in 2014, her son Don Carlos Fitz-James Stuart, 19th Duke of Alba (born 1948) succeeded to the title. The heir apparent to the dukedom is his eldest son Don Fernando Fitz-James Stuart, 17th Duke of Huéscar (born 1990).

History
The peerage and its subsidiary titles were generally considered to have been forfeit by the English parliament in 1695, when James FitzJames was attainted following the enforced exile of his father. The College of Arms in its Roll of the Peerage does not list any such title, which means that it is non-existent today in England.

Nevertheless, the titles were recognized in France as de facto Jacobite peerages by Louis XIV, King of France to please the exiled James II & VII, along with other Jacobite peerages recognized in France, like Duke of Perth, Duke of Melfort, etc. On 13 December 1707, Philip V confirmed or issued the title in Spain, and he conferred the dignity of Grandee of Spain on James FitzJames, 1st Duke of Berwick. The grandeeship is attached to the Spanish title of Duke of Berwick.

If the English peerage title was still extant, that title is only inheritable in the male line. At the death of Don Jacobo Fitz-James Stuart, 17th Duke of Alba and 10th Duke of Berwick, the English title would have been inherited by his nephew Don Fernando FitzJames Stuart, 15th Duke of Peñaranda de Duero (1922–1971), and subsequently by Fernando's son Don Jacobo FitzJames Stuart, 16th Duke of Peñaranda de Duero and current head of the House of FitzJames (born in 1947 and without children).

The Spanish title, with the accompanying dignity of Grandee of Spain, follows the inheritance rules of that country. Spanish noble titles historically have followed the rule of male-preference primogeniture, which allows a female to succeed if she has no living brothers and no deceased brothers who left surviving legitimate descendants. With the death of the 10th Duke of Berwick in September 1953, his only child, Doña Cayetana Fitz-James Stuart, 18th Duchess of Alba, succeeded him in his Spanish titles, including the Spanish dukedom of Berwick. With her death in November 2014, the dukedom passed to her eldest son, Don Carlos Fitz-James Stuart y Martínez de Irujo.

Dukes of Berwick (1687–1695)

Jacobite Dukes of Berwick (1695–present)

Spanish Dukes of Berwick (1707–present)
Before 1953, the Spanish Dukes were also the Jacobite Dukes of Berwick. The line split due to the differences between the Spanish and Jacobite  succession laws (male-preference primogeniture and agnatic primogeniture respectively).

References

External links
Hernando Fitzjames-Stuart in Spanish

Berwick-upon-Tweed
Dukedoms of Spain
Grandees of Spain
Forfeited dukedoms in the Peerage of England
Noble titles created in 1687
Dukedoms in the Jacobite Peerage